The Bahamian Democratic Party was a political party in the Bahamas. It contested the 1977 general elections, in which it received 26.9% of the votes and won six seats, becoming the largest opposition party in Parliament. However, it did contest the 1982 elections.

References

Defunct political parties in the Bahamas